Castlehill is a townland and village near the west coast of Lough Conn in County Mayo, Ireland. Historically it was called Keerhannaun or Keerhanaun, which are anglicisations of its Irish name.

References

See also
 List of towns and villages in the Republic of Ireland

Towns and villages in County Mayo